Marko Perović (Serbian Cyrillic: Марко Перовић; born 24 March 1972) is a Serbian professional football manager and former player.

External links
 Profile at Serbian Federation website
 

Living people
1972 births
Sportspeople from Leskovac
Yugoslav footballers
Serbian footballers
Serbia and Montenegro international footballers
Serie A players
Serie B players
Eredivisie players
Segunda División players
Austrian Football Bundesliga players
FK Vojvodina players
Red Star Belgrade footballers
FK Rad players
U.S. Cremonese players
SBV Vitesse players
Sporting de Gijón players
FK Austria Wien players
A.C. Ancona players
S.S.C. Napoli players
F.C. Grosseto S.S.D. players
U.S. Pistoiese 1921 players
Serbian expatriate footballers
Serbia and Montenegro expatriate footballers
Serbia and Montenegro footballers
Serbia and Montenegro expatriate sportspeople in Italy
Expatriate footballers in Italy
Serbia and Montenegro expatriate sportspeople in the Netherlands
Expatriate footballers in the Netherlands
Serbia and Montenegro expatriate sportspeople in Austria
Expatriate footballers in Austria
Serbian expatriate sportspeople in Italy
Association football midfielders